Cuinchy ( or ) is a commune in the Pas-de-Calais department in the Hauts-de-France region of France.

Geography

History
The village was the source of the de Quincy family, who played a major part in the history of medieval England and Scotland.

During the First World War, Cuinchy was on the front line between German and Allied forces and severely damaged. After the war, the church of St. Pierre was rebuilt, as was most of the village. Cuinchy also was the site of sustained underground fighting between German and British tunnelling units.

Population

Places of interest
 The rebuilt church of St.Pierre
 The war memorial
 Three Commonwealth War Graves Commission cemeteries

See also
Communes of the Pas-de-Calais department

References

External links

 The Guards’ cemetery, Windy Corner
 Woburn Abbey CWGC cemetery
 The CWGC graveyard in the communal cemetery

Communes of Pas-de-Calais